These pages list all described species of the spider family Araneidae as of Nov. 5, 2013.

List of Araneidae species: A
List of Araneidae species: B–F
List of Araneidae species: G–M
List of Araneidae species: N–Z

Lists of spider species by family